Doko Airport  is an airport near Doko in Haut-Uélé Province, Democratic Republic of the Congo. The airport has been greatly expanded to serve the gold mining operation at Kalimva, the northwestern section of the Kibali gold deposit.

See also
 
 
 Transport in the Democratic Republic of the Congo
 List of airports in the Democratic Republic of the Congo

References

External links
 HERE Maps - Doko
 OurAirports - Doko
 

Airports in Haut-Uélé